John Dickinson (1732–1808) was a Founding Father of the United States active in Delaware and Pennsylvania.

John Dickinson may also refer to:

John Dean Dickinson (1767–1841), lawyer and U.S. Representative from New York
John Dickinson (inventor) (1782–1869), founder of the paper mills at Apsley and Nash Mills in Hertfordshire, England
John Dickinson (judge) (1806–1882), judge and politician in colonial New South Wales
John Dickinson (bishop) (1901–1993), Assistant English Bishop of Melanesia
John Dickinson (physician) (1927–2015), British physician and clinical researcher
John Dickinson (rugby league) (1934–2021), rugby league footballer of the 1950s for England, and St Helens RLFC
John Dickinson (author) (born 1962), English author of young adult novels
John Dickinson (writer) (1815–1876), English writer on India
John Dickinson (magistrate) (1848/9–1933), chief magistrate of the Metropolitan Police Courts until 1920

See also
John Dickenson (disambiguation)
Jonathan Dickinson (disambiguation)
John Dickinson High School, in Milltown, Delaware